The 1988 Masters Tournament was the 52nd Masters Tournament, held April 7–10 at Augusta National Golf Club in Augusta, Georgia. Sandy Lyle won his second major title with a birdie on the 72nd hole to win by one stroke over runner-up Mark Calcavecchia.

Lyle led after 36 and 54 holes, but relinquished the lead on the final nine; he carded a double-bogey on the par-3 12th after his tee shot hit the bank and rolled back into Rae's Creek. Having failed to make birdie on either of the two par-5s on the back nine, he remained one stroke behind Calcavecchia at the par-3 16th. Lyle's tee shot found the green and left him with a  putt for birdie, which he holed.

Tied for the lead on the 18th tee, Lyle's 1-iron tee shot found the fairway bunker. After holing the birdie putt, Lyle danced up the green to claim his only green jacket.

From Scotland, Lyle was the first winner of the Masters from the United Kingdom, which had four consecutive with Nick Faldo's playoff wins in 1989 and 1990 and Ian Woosnam's one-stroke victory in 1991. Decades later, Lyle's approach shot from the bunker on the final hole is still regularly referred to by BBC commentators, particularly Peter Alliss, who almost without fail, remark that any shot rolling back to the pin on the 18th has 'shades of Sandy Lyle' about it.

Field
1. Masters champions
Tommy Aaron, George Archer, Seve Ballesteros (3,8,9), Gay Brewer, Billy Casper, Charles Coody, Ben Crenshaw (8,9,10,11,12), Raymond Floyd (2), Doug Ford, Bernhard Langer (8,9,12), Larry Mize (9,12,13), Jack Nicklaus (8), Arnold Palmer, Gary Player, Craig Stadler (8), Art Wall Jr., Tom Watson (3,8,9,11,12), Fuzzy Zoeller (2)

Jack Burke Jr., Bob Goalby, Claude Harmon, Ben Hogan, Herman Keiser, Cary Middlecoff, Byron Nelson, Henry Picard, Gene Sarazen, and Sam Snead did not play.

2. U.S. Open champions (last five years)
Larry Nelson (4,11,12,13), Andy North, Scott Simpson (11,12,13)

3. The Open champions (last five years)
Nick Faldo (11), Sandy Lyle (8,11), Greg Norman (8,12)

4. PGA champions (last five years)
Hubert Green, Hal Sutton (12,13), Lee Trevino, Bob Tway

5. 1987 U.S. Amateur semi-finalists
Stephen Ford (a), Scott Gump (a), Billy Mayfair (6,7,a), Eric Rebmann (a)

6. Previous two U.S. Amateur and Amateur champions
Buddy Alexander (7,a), David Curry (a), Paul Mayo (a)

7. Members of the 1987 U.S. Walker Cup team
Bob Lewis (a), Bill Loeffler (a), Len Mattiace (a), Brian Montgomery (a), Jay Sigel (a)

Billy Andrade, Chris Kite, Jim Sorenson forfeited their exemptions by turning professional.

8. Top 24 players and ties from the 1987 Masters Tournament
Paul Azinger (11,12), Chip Beck (11,12), Mark Calcavecchia (12,13), Chen Tze-chung, John Cook (11,12), Jay Haas (11), Tom Kite (11,12,13), Gary Koch, Roger Maltbie, Mark McCumber (10,11,12), Jodie Mudd, Mark O'Meara (12), Nick Price (12), Curtis Strange (9,11,12,13), Bobby Wadkins (9,10,12), Lanny Wadkins (10,11,12,13), D. A. Weibring (10,11,12)

9. Top 16 players and ties from the 1987 U.S. Open
Isao Aoki, Lennie Clements, Bob Eastwood, Tsuneyuki Nakajima, Mac O'Grady, Dan Pohl (12,13), Tim Simpson, Jim Thorpe

10. Top eight players and ties from 1987 PGA Championship
Scott Hoch (12), Don Pooley (11,12)

11. Winners of PGA Tour events since the previous Masters
Dave Barr, Ken Brown, Keith Clearwater, Fred Couples (12), Gary Hallberg, Steve Jones, Kenny Knox, Davis Love III, Steve Pate (12), Sam Randolph, Mike Reid (12), Joey Sindelar, J. C. Snead, Doug Tewell, Robert Wrenn

John Inman, the winner of the Provident Classic was not invited.

12. Top 30 players from the 1987 PGA Tour money list
David Frost, Corey Pavin, Jeff Sluman, Payne Stewart (13)

13. Members of the U.S. 1987 Ryder Cup team
Andy Bean

14. Special foreign invitation
Rodger Davis, Mark McNulty, Ian Woosnam

Round summaries

First round
Thursday, April 7, 1988

Source:

Second round
Friday, April 8, 1988

Source:

Third round
Saturday, April 9, 1988

Source:

Final round
Sunday, April 10, 1988

Final leaderboard

Sources:

Scorecard

Cumulative tournament scores, relative to par
{|class="wikitable" span = 50 style="font-size:85%;
|-
|style="background: Red;" width=10|
|Eagle
|style="background: Pink;" width=10|
|Birdie
|style="background: PaleGreen;" width=10|
|Bogey
|style="background: Green;" width=10|
|Double bogey
|}
Source:

References

External links
Masters.com – Past winners and results
Augusta.com – 1988 Masters leaderboard and scorecards

1988
1988 in golf
1988 in American sports
1988 in sports in Georgia (U.S. state)
April 1988 sports events in the United States